Xishan Forest Park is a forest park located 15 kilometers west of Kunming City, Yunnan Province, China. Situated in Western Mountains (Xi Shan), which rise to the west of Dian Lake, it occupies an area of 889 hectares, its highest peak (Mt. Luohan) being 2507.5 meters above sea level, and about 620 meters from the water surface of Dian Lake.

There are in the forest park several scenic spots, such as the Dragon Gate (Long Men), Sanqing Ge, Huating Temple, Taihua Temple, and the tomb of Nie Er, the composer of the Chinese National Anthem and a native of Kunming.

Transportation
Public bus service is available from Kunming city to the northern end of the forest park. There is also a cable car service available from the Yunnan Ethnic Village over Dian Lake to West Mountains.

See also 
Forest park
Western Mountains

References

External links 

Tourist attractions in Kunming
Forest parks in China